Ervin Nagy is a Hungarian pianist and composer.

Biography 

Born in Győr, Hungary, Nagy started studying music at an early age and piano at the age of 11. He later won 1st Prize at the National Youth Piano Competition in Tarhos. He was a student at the F. Liszt Academy of Music when he received 3rd Prize at the Porto International Piano Competition in Portugal in 1989.

Since then, Nagy has performed solo and chamber music in Bayreuth, Bratislava, Brussels, Budapest, Dublin, Houston, Cologne, London, New York, Melbourne, Rome, Tokyo, Salzburg, Stockholm, Stuttgart, Vienna and Washington D.C.

In 1990 Nagy was awarded the Liszt-Cliburn Scholarship which enabled him to study further in the United States. In the following years he won numerous prizes including 1st Prize at the Hemphil Wels Sorrantin International Music Competition, 1st Prize at the Oklahoma Symphony International Music Competition and 1st Prize at the Joanna Hodges International Piano Competition (now Virginia Waring Intn. P. C.)in California. He also participated in masterclasses with J. Achucarro, D. Baskhirov, Norma Fisher, V. Mershanov, T. Vásáry and Andre Watts.

Nagy has recorded for labels, Hungaroton and BIS and is a founding member of Trio Art Nouveau.

After returning to Europe Nagy was based both in Budapest and Salzburg until 2000 when he started teaching at the Liszt Academy. In 2001 he began composing music for video games and multimedia

In 2009 Nagy moved to the United Kingdom.

Compositions 

His compositions are mostly chamber music and solo piano pieces.

 Sonata for Violoncello and Piano
 Duos for 2 Violin
 Songs on a poems of László Nagy (Bass and Piano Trio)
 Scherzo for Piano Trio
 Thoughts for Piano
 Caricatures for Solo Flute
 Recordare (Mixed Choir)
 Sacerdotes Domini (Mixed Choir, Organ)

References 

Hungarian pianists
Living people
Year of birth missing (living people)
People from Győr
21st-century pianists
21st-century Hungarian male musicians